Duke of Almazán de Saint Priest, is a title of Spanish nobility that is accompanied by the dignity of Grandee of Spain. It was granted to Emmanuel Louis Guignard de Saint-Priest on 30 September 1830 by King Ferdinand VII.

At the death of the 3rd Duchess, the title became vacant, until Juan Carlos I rehabilitated it on behalf of Louis Provence Boniface de Castellane, a direct descendant of the 3rd Duchess, on 22 January 1993. Initially created as "Duke of Almazán", it was rehabilitated as "Duke of Almazán de Saint Priest", in order to differentiate it from the older Dukedom of Almazán.

Dukes of Almazán de Saint Priest (1830)
 Emmanuel Louis Marie Guignard de Saint-Priest, 1st Duke of Almazán
 François Marie Joseph Guignard de Saint-Priest, 2nd Duke of Almazán
 Marguerite Louise Guignard de Saint-Priest, 3rd Duchess of Almazán
 Louis Provence Boniface de Castellane, 4th Duke of Almazán de Saint Priest
 Béatrice Marguerite Marie-Thérèse de Castellane, 5th Duchess of Almazán de Saint Priest

See also
List of dukes in the peerage of Spain
List of current Grandees of Spain

References 

Dukedoms of Spain
Grandees of Spain
Lists of dukes
Lists of Spanish nobility